= 2026 Fiji Futsal League =

Fiji Futsal League
- Season: 2026
- Dates: 8 April—9 September
- Champions: Ba

The 2026 Fiji Futsal League, known as the Extra Futsal League for sponsorship reasons, was a season of the Fiji Futsal League, the top-level competition for men's futsal in Fiji. The league consisted of three geographic zones, each competing for a spot in the semi-finals. Ba won the final on 4 October.

== Schedule ==
Matches first began in April 2026. They were held at different venues depending on the region they were located in.

== Northern Zone ==
The Northern Zone matches were held from 17 April to 21 August 2026.

=== League table ===
Pos	Team	Pld	W	D	L	GF	GA	GD	Pts
1	Labasa (C)	8	7	1	0	44	12	+32	22
2	Dreketi	8	4	1	3	44	18	+26	13
3	Nadogo	8	4	0	4	15	25	−10	12
4	Savusavu	8	2	2	4	24	18	+6	8
5	Seaqaqa	8	1	0	7	9	63	−54	3

Source: Fiji FA
(C) Champions

== Southern Zone ==
The Southern Zone matches were held from 8 April to 9 September 2026.

=== League table ===
Pos	Team	Pld	W	D	L	GF	GA	GD	Pts
1	Suva (C)	12	10	2	0	67	9	+58	32
2	Tailevu Naitasiri	12	8	2	2	74	22	+52	26
3	Lami	12	7	2	3	56	23	+33	23
4	Rewa	12	6	1	5	47	28	+19	19
5	Nasinu	12	4	1	7	28	31	−3	13
6	Northland Tailevu	12	3	0	9	21	94	−73	9
7	Navua	12	0	0	12	16	102	−86	0

Source: Fiji FA
(C) Champions

== Western Zone ==
The Western Zone matches were held from 18 April to 8 August 2026.

=== League table ===
Pos	Team	Pld	W	D	L	GF	GA	GD	Pts
1	Ba (C)	10	8	2	0	47	9	+38	26
2	Nadi	10	8	1	1	39	13	+26	25
3	Rakiraki	10	5	1	4	20	11	+9	16
4	Nadroga	10	3	2	5	18	24	−6	11
5	Lautoka	10	3	0	7	19	42	−23	9
6	Tavua	10	0	0	10	7	51	−44	0

Source: Fiji FA
(C) Champions

== Playoff ==
=== Semi-finals ===
The semi-finals were held on 3 October 2026.

==== Results ====
3 October 2026

Labasa Futsal	3–2	Suva Futsal
	Report

3 October 2026

Ba Futsal	4–3	Lami Futsal
	Report

=== Final ===
4 October 2026

Ba Futsal	4–1	Labasa Futsal
	Report
